The 2013 Chinese Super League was the tenth season since the establishment of the Chinese Super League, the 20th season of a professional football league and the 52nd top-tier league season in China. Guangzhou Evergrande won their third consecutive title with an 18-point advantage ahead of runners-up Shandong Luneng.

Promotion and relegation 
Teams promoted from 2012 China League One
 Shanghai SIPG (Shanghai Tellace)
 Wuhan Zall

Teams disbanded 
 Dalian Shide (Withdrew from the League system)

Teams relegated to 2013 China League One
 Henan Jianye

Clubs

Clubs and locations

Managerial changes

Foreign players

The number of foreign players is restricted to five per CSL team, including a slot for a player from AFC countries. A team can use four foreign players on the field in each game, including at least one player from the AFC country. Players from Hong Kong, Macau and Chinese Taipei are deemed to be native players in CSL.

Players name in bold indicates the player is registered during the mid-season transfer window.

Hong Kong/Macau/Taiwan players (doesn't count on the foreign player slot)

 Foreign players who left their clubs after first half of the season.

League table

Results

Positions by round

Goalscorers

Top scorers

Source:Soccerway

Hat-tricks

Awards
 Chinese Football Association Footballer of the Year:  Darío Conca (Guangzhou Evergrande)
 Chinese Super League Golden Boot Winner:  Elkeson (Guangzhou Evergrande)
 Chinese Super League Domestic Golden Boot Award:  Wu Lei (Shanghai SIPG)
 Chinese Football Association Goalkeeper of the Year:  Zeng Cheng (Guangzhou Evergrande)
 Chinese Football Association Young Player of the Year:  Jin Jingdao (Shandong Luneng Taishan)
 Chinese Football Association Manager of the Year:  Marcello Lippi (Guangzhou Evergrande)
 Chinese Football Association Referee of the Year:  Li Jun (Jiangsu)
 Chinese Super League Fair Play Award: Shanghai SIPG, Guangzhou Evergrande, Beijing Guoan
 Chinese Super League Team of the Year (442):
GK  Zeng Cheng (Guangzhou Evergrande) 
DF  Zhang Linpeng (Guangzhou Evergrande),  Xu Yunlong (Beijing Guoan),  Kim Young-Gwon (Guangzhou Evergrande),  Zheng Zheng (Shandong Luneng Taishan)
MF  Zheng Zhi (Guangzhou Evergrande),  Zhang Xizhe (Beijing Guoan),  Wang Yongpo (Shandong Luneng Taishan),  Darío Conca (Guangzhou Evergrande)
FW  Elkeson (Guangzhou Evergrande),  Muriqui (Guangzhou Evergrande)

League Attendance

†

†

Top 10 Attendances

Source:CSL Official Site

References

External links
Current CSL table, and recent results/fixtures at Soccerway
China Super League fixtures and league table at fourfourtwo.com
Chinese Super League official site 

Chinese Super League seasons
1
China
China